Anne Kremer  (born 17 October 1975) is a Luxembourgish retired tennis player. Anne won two singles titles on the WTA Tour. On 29 July 2002, she achieved her best WTA ranking of world No. 18.

Anne completed her schooling at the Athénée de Luxembourg and subsequently studied English and history at Stanford University in California.

Kremer is a member of the Democratic and Liberal Youth in Luxembourg, and has entered politics. She ran for the Democratic Party in the 2009 election to the Chamber of Deputies of Luxembourg. Running in Centre, she finished 15th on the DP list, and was thus not elected.

Biography

Kremer was born in 1975 to father Jean (an engineer), and mother Ginette (a physical education teacher). Early in her career, Kremer was coached by her younger brother, Gilles. Later, she was coached by Stephane Vix. Kremer is a baseliner right-handed player with a strong backhand and a preference for grass and hard pack playing surfaces. Beside Luxembourgish, Kremer is fluent in English, French and German and plans to become a translator.

WTA career finals

Singles: 4 (2 titles, 2 runner-ups)

ITF Circuit finals

Singles: 12 (5–7)

Doubles: 1 (1–0)

Grand Slam singles performance timeline

Head-to-head record
 Serena Williams 0–1
 Anke Huber 1–3
 Martina Hingis 0–1
 Maria Sharapova 0–2
 Lindsay Davenport 0–5
 Henrieta Nagyová 2–0
 Elena Dementieva 0–2
 Venus Williams 0–3
 Dinara Safina 0–1

Footnotes

External links

 
 
 
 

Luxembourgian female tennis players
Olympic tennis players of Luxembourg
Tennis players at the 2000 Summer Olympics
Democratic Party (Luxembourg) politicians
Luxembourgian sportsperson-politicians
1975 births
Living people
Sportspeople from Luxembourg City
Alumni of the Athénée de Luxembourg
Stanford University alumni
Stanford Cardinal women's tennis players